Syllepte belialis is a moth in the family Crambidae. It was described by Francis Walker in 1859. It is found in Brazil, Honduras, Costa Rica, Jamaica, Puerto Rico and Cuba.

References

Moths described in 1859
Moths of South America
Moths of Central America
Moths of the Caribbean
belialis
Taxa named by Francis Walker (entomologist)